This is a list of films produced by the Ollywood film industry based in Bhubaneshwar and Cuttack in 2005:

A-Z

References

2005
Ollywood
2000s in Orissa
2005 in Indian cinema